The Lichte (Thuringia) station   was a Deutsche Reichsbahn station in the Thuringian municipality of Lichte in the district of Saalfeld-Rudolstadt. The station is elevated 623 m above Sea Level.

History 
The Probstzella–Schmiedefeld line opened at the end of 1898, and it was extended to Lichte-Ost in 1899. At this time that final destination was called "Bock Wallendorrf". But only 10 years later, in 1909, the project to extend the line to Lichte (Thüringen), Ernstthal (with junction to Neuhaus am Rennweg), and further to Lauscha was started. Finally, in 1913 the railway construction was completed and the train service from the Probstzella station to Sonnenberg via Lichte-Ost  and Lichte (Thüringen) could be opened.

The railway Sonneberg-Probstzelle survived two World Wars and the GDR period. However, on 22 January 1997, traffic ceased, and in July 2006 the final closure of that particular railway section Ernstthal Gräfenthal was agreed by the Eisenbahnbundesamt.

In the meanwhile the Deutsche Regionaleisenbahn rent this rail line. Since 2008 tourist service by usage of rail-cycle draisines on the rail line from Schmiedefeld (Lichtetal) via Lichte (Thuringia) east station to Lichte (Thuringia) station has been established. The highlight of a draisine tour is the crossing of the Viaduct Hammerwiesen in Lichte (Wallendorf), close to the Lichte (Thuringia) east station.

See also
Lichte (Thuringia) east station

Notes

References
Wolfgang Beyer, Emil Ehle: Über den Rennsteig - Von Sonneberg nach Probstzella. Transpress Verlag, Berlin 1983,

External links 
History by Lothar Brill.de
Imiges stations and line.de
Railway time-table (de:Kursbuch) from 1944.de
Short information of Lichte.de

Railway stations in Thuringia
Lichte
Buildings and structures in Saalfeld-Rudolstadt
Railway stations in Germany opened in 1913
Railway stations closed in 1997